is a Japanese manga series written and illustrated by Umi Sakurai. Self-published as a webcomic by Sakurai before being serialized by Square Enix Manga, the series follows an older widower who adopts an unwanted cat.

A live-action adaptation started airing on January 1, 2021. The cats are portrayed by puppets.

Synopsis
Fukumaru, a large and homely Exotic Shorthair at a pet store, is regularly passed over in favor of kittens that are younger and cuter than he is. He is unexpectedly purchased by Kanda, an older man who is recently widowed and who has a distant relationship with his adult children. The episodic, slice of life series follows Kanda and Fukumaru as they live and seek mutual companionship together.

Characters
Kanda Fuyuki

Media

Manga
A Man and His Cat was originally self-published by Sakurai, with new entries in the series posted weekly on her Twitter and Pixiv accounts. The series is also published by Square Enix in its manga magazines Monthly Shōnen Gangan and Gangan Pixiv, and has been collected into nine tankōbon volumes. To date, the series has received over 560 million views.

In May 2019, Penguin Random House announced that it would partner with Square Enix to launch Square Enix Manga as an imprint in North America, with A Man and His Cat as one of the imprint's anchor titles. The first volume of the series was released in English in February 2020.

Video game
In the eighth volume of the manga, it was revealed that a video game adaptation is in development.

Other media
Short motion comic videos have been produced to promote the release of the tankōbon editions of the series, and feature Jouji Nakata as the voice of Kanda.

Reception
A Man and His Cat has received positive reviews from critics. Anime UK News gave the series 8 out of 10, praising the narrative for being heartwarming without being overly sentimental. Manga Bookshelf noted that the book "hits you in the feels" and praised the quality of its storytelling.

A Man and His Cat was one of the top-selling physical manga series on Amazon Japan in 2018. The first Japanese tankōbon edition of the series debuted at 3rd in the Oricon sales rankings.

In 2018, A Man and His Cat was one of the top recommended manga titles in a survey of Japanese bookstore employees.  That same year, the series was a runner-up in for the Grand Prize at the magazine's Next Manga Awards organized by the manga magazine Da Vinci. Da Vinci also ranked A Man and His Cat in its annual Book of the Year rankings in 2018 and 2019. The series also placed fourth in the 2018 Pixiv's Comic Ranking, and third in Pixiv's 2018 Web Manga General Election. The 2019 edition of Kono Manga ga Sugoi! ranked A Man and His Cat as the fifth best manga series for female readers.

References

External links
 A Man and His Cat at Gangan Comics (in Japanese)
 A Man and His Cat at Pixiv (in Japanese)
 

2017 manga
2010s webcomics
Comedy anime and manga
Comics about cats
Gangan Comics manga
Japanese webcomics
Slice of life anime and manga
TV Tokyo original programming
Webcomics in print